Paing Takhon is a Burmese model, actor and singer. He began his entertainment career in 2014 as a runway model. He is also one of the few Myanmar citizens with an international profile, given the country only began opening up to the outside world over the last decade.

In 2018, Paing Takhon featured on the BuzzFeed's "23 Stunning South Asian Men That Are Too Gorgeous For Words". In 2019, he was listed on The Myanmar Times "Top 10 Actors".

Early life and education
Paing Takhon was born in Kawthaung, Tanintharyi Region, Myanmar to parent Tun Moe and his wife Khin Kyu. He grew up in Khamaukgyi. He is the fourth child of six siblings, having an elder brother, two elder sisters and two younger brothers. He graduated high school from Basic Education High School No. 1 Khamaukgyi. In 2014, he moved to Yangon to become a model. He is currently studying at University of Distance Education, Yangon, majoring in Psychology.

Career

2014–2016: Beginnings as a model
He joined John Lwin's model training in 2014. Since then, he took professional training in modelling and catwalk. He began his entertainment career as a runway model as part of the John Lwin's Star & Model International Modeling Agency with countless advertising shows and runways that had been walked on. Then came the offers for TV commercials and then DVD ones. He has appeared in many music videos and as fashion model on magazine cover photos. His hardwork as a model and acting in commercials was noticed by the film industry and soon, movie casting offers came rolling in.

In 2016, he attended to Indonesia to take part in "Asean Celebrity Explore Quest Malaysia 2016" (ACEQM) together with Nan Su Yati Soe as a representative from Myanmar which is held with famous celebrities and models from South East Asia countries. They performed together U Shwe Yoe and Daw Moe dance at the event.

2017–present: Acting debut and rising popularity
Rising to fame in 2017, he became an actor. He made his acting debut with a leading role in the film Midnight Traveller alonsige Nang Khin Zay Yar. He then starred in drama film Bad Boys 2 (Angel of Bad Boys), where he played the main role. In 2018, he portrayed the male lead in action horror film Thaman Kyar (Weretiger) alongside Angel Lamung.

In March 2019, it was announced that he has been cast as the male lead of the documentary drama series Kha Yee Thwar Kauk Kyaung (Traveller's Notes) alongside Thinzar Wint Kyaw. In April 2019, he was cast in the horror film Thu Bal Thu Lae (Who is he?).

As of 2019, he became popular in Thailand, a rare case of fame in the country for a celebrity from Myanmar.
On 3 August 2019, he held a grand fan meeting in Bangkok, Thailand, where a huge crowd of many fans gathered. He appeared in commercial endorsements and soap operas in Thailand. He is an ASEAN Economic Community ambassador. On 21 September 2019, he was appointed as Myanmar's tourism ambassador to Thailand by the Myanmar Tourism Marketing Association together with the Myanmar Tourism Federation. He was named No. 10 in the "100 Most Handsome Faces of 2020" by TC Candler.

In 2020, he was set to star in the upcoming film The Clock: Red Wall directed by Cambodian director Leak Lyda.

In December 2021, Paing Takhon was ranked #1 in "The 100 Most Handsome Faces of 2021" list issued by TC Candler.

Music career
Paing Takhon started singing in 2017. He launched his debut solo album Chit Thu (Lover) on 16 September 2017. He donated all his money from selling his albums to orphan children from Ananda Metta orphan school.

Brand ambassadorships
He is also known as the face of many brands. His first brand worked as the ambassador for Pond's Myanmar in 2014. In 2019, he started working as brand ambassador for major brands such as Oppo Myanmar, Telenor Myanmar, Sunkist Myanmar, T247 energy drink, MG Vehicles Myanmar and Sailun Tire Myanmar.

Business
Paing Takhon is a business partner and share holder of the United Amara Bank. He is also the founder of a beauty product company.

Political activities
Following the 2021 Myanmar coup d'état, Paing Takhon was active in the anti-coup movement both in person at rallies and through social media. Denouncing the military coup, he has taken part in protests since February. He joined the "We Want Justice" three-finger salute movement. The movement was launched on social media, and many celebrities have joined the movement.

On 7 April 2021, warrants for his arrest were issued under section 505 (a) of the Myanmar Penal Code by the State Administration Council for speaking out against the military coup. Along with several other celebrities, he was charged with calling for participation in the Civil Disobedience Movement (CDM) and damaging the state's ability to govern, with supporting the Committee Representing Pyidaungsu Hluttaw, and with generally inciting the people to disturb the peace and stability of the nation.

On 8 April 2021, he was arrested and taken into custody in the North Dagon area of Yangon at 5:00 am from his mother's home, according to local media reports. He was suffering from cerebral malaria and congenital diseases including coronary heart disease and asthma at the time when he was arrested. He was sentenced to three years of hard labor. He was released from Insein Prison under a state pardon on 2 March 2022.

Filmography

Film (Cinema)

Television series

Discography

Solo albums
 Chit Thu (Lover (2016)

References

Living people
Burmese male models
Burmese male film actors
21st-century Burmese male actors
21st-century Burmese male singers
People from Tanintharyi Region
Prisoners and detainees of Myanmar
Year of birth missing (living people)